Peter Brimelow (born 13 October 1947) is a British-born American white nationalist and white supremacist writer. He is the founder of the website VDARE, an anti-immigration site associated with white supremacy, white nationalism, and the alt-right. He believes that "whites built American culture" and that "it is at risk from non-whites who would seek to change it".

Brimelow was previously a writer and editor at National Review, and columnist for Dow Jones' MarketWatch. Brimelow founded the Center for American Unity in 1999 and served as its first president. He describes himself as a paleoconservative. Brimelow has also been described as a leader within the alt-right movement. He rejects the labels of "white supremacist" and "white nationalist" and prefers to be known as a "civic nationalist". In January 2021, a judge dismissed a lawsuit Brimelow brought against The New York Times, ruling that his being called a "white nationalist" was not defamatory. According to the New York Times, Brimelow had a direct reporting relationship with Rupert Murdoch at Fox News.

Early life and education
Brimelow was born in 1947 in Warrington, Lancashire, England, the son of Bessie (née Knox) and Frank Sanderson Brimelow, a transport executive. Brimelow (and his twin brother) studied at the University of Sussex (BA, 1970) and Stanford University (MBA, 1972).

Career 
After working as a securities analyst, he moved to Toronto to work as a business writer and editor at the Financial Post and Maclean's. From 1978 to 1980, he was an aide to US Senator Orrin Hatch. In 1980, Brimelow moved to New York and worked for Barron's and Fortune. 

In 1990, Brimelow and Leslie Spencer's article "The Litigation Scandal", written for Forbes, won a Gerald Loeb Award in the "Magazine" category.

Views and publications
Brimelow opposes both illegal and legal immigration, despite having immigrated to the United States himself, and has referred to Spanish-speaking immigrants as "completely dysfunctional". He said California used to be a "paradise" but was "rapidly turning into Hispanic slum". Brimelow has been described as a white nationalist and a white supremacist. In 2020, Brimelow sued The New York Times for labeling him a "white nationalist". In 2022, after reports of a draft Supreme Court opinion overturning Roe v. Wade, he wrote, "Next step Brown vs. Board!" in opposition to the landmark decision overturning segregation.

The Southern Poverty Law Center (SPLC) has described Brimelow's website VDARE as a hate group, that was "once a relatively mainstream anti-immigration page", but by 2003 became "a meeting place for many on the radical right". The SPLC also criticized VDARE for publishing articles by white nationalists Jared Taylor and Sam Francis. It has been called "white nationalist" by the Rocky Mountain News. It has also been described as white supremacist. VDARE has also been described by the Anti-Defamation League as a racist anti-immigrant group.

Brimelow has appeared as a guest on The Political Cesspool, a "pro-white" talk radio show. Following the 2008 presidential election, Brimelow advocated that to win, the Republican Party should focus on "white votes".

As of 2010 he was a senior contributing editor at Alternative Right, a website edited by Richard Spencer, according to the SPLC. He has spoken at events hosted by the National Policy Institute run by Spencer, according to the SPLC.

Brimelow appeared on a panel discussing multiculturalism during the 2012 Conservative Political Action Conference (CPAC 2012), and gave a talk titled "The Failure of Multiculturalism: How the pursuit of diversity is weakening the American Identity". In the face of condemnation from MSNBC and PFTAW, Al Cardenas of the American Conservative Union denied knowing Brimelow. 

Larry Auster, also a prominent immigration restrictionist, was a fierce critic of Brimelow's approach to the issue. For example, Auster criticized Brimelow's promotion of the views of antisemitic conspiracy theorist Kevin MacDonald in the following manner: "The views of Alex Linder are not fundamentally different from those of Kevin MacDonald, who is published by Peter Brimelow and Richard Spencer. The only real difference between Linder and MacDonald is that Linder explicitly touts his goal of removing all Jews from the earth, while in MacDonald’s case the same goal is implicit."

Alien Nation
 
Brimelow's book Alien Nation: Common Sense About America's Immigration Disaster criticizes U.S. immigration policy after 1965.

A review in Foreign Affairs acknowledged that the book raised a number of persuasive objections to contemporary American immigration policies, but criticized Brimelow for "defining American identity in racial as opposed to cultural terms", and for the "extreme character" of his proposals.

The SPLC described it as an "infamous anti-immigrant book", and pointed to Center for Immigration Studies executive director Mark Krikorian's positive review of the book as evidence his organization had close ties to white nationalists.

The Worm in the Apple
 
The Worm in the Apple discusses public education and teachers' unions, considering unions as "highly destructive". David Gordon summarizes Brimelow's view in his review of the book in The Mises Review: "to attempt so far-reaching a goal as universal high school education is foolish." John O'Sullivan praised the book. For the Hoover Institution journal Education Next, public policy consultant George Mitchell wrote: "Brimelow... demonstrates how collective bargaining for teachers has produced labor agreements that stifle innovation and risk taking. He makes it clear that the dramatic rise in influence enjoyed by the teacher unions has coincided with stagnant and unacceptable levels of student performance." However, in the same journal article, education consultant Julia E. Koppich took a more critical angle: "Brimelow uses a variety of linguistic devices to drive home his points. But his over-the-top language soon grates on the nerves... His argument is not that teacher unions are destroying American education, but that they labor long and hard to preserve the status quo... But this book contains so little about education-virtually nothing about classrooms, schools, or districts-even that point gets lost." Koppich called the book "an anti-public school polemic".

The Patriot Game
In an article in Maclean's which was published in 2011, John M. Geddes says that Brimelow's book The Patriot Game: National Dreams and Political Realities "offered a bracingly of-the-moment conservative critique of Canada," and said that it was instrumental in shaping the thought process of Canadian Prime Minister Stephen Harper.

Writings
 
 
 Also published as 
 
 
 Also see: letter to the editor, responding to critics –

References

External links

 Southern Poverty Law Center's Intelligence Report on Brimelow

1947 births
Living people
21st-century American journalists
21st-century American male writers
21st-century American non-fiction writers
Alt-right writers
Alumni of the University of Sussex
Anti-immigration activists
American business and financial journalists
American chief executives in the media industry
American columnists
American magazine founders
American magazine editors
American magazine journalists
American male journalists
American white nationalists
British emigrants to the United States
Businesspeople from New York City
Critics of multiculturalism
Employees of the United States Senate
Gerald Loeb Award winners for Magazines
American opinion journalists
Paleoconservatism
People from Warrington
Stanford Graduate School of Business alumni
Writers from New York City